Persatuan Sepakbola Padang (simply known as PSP Padang) is an Indonesian football club based in Padang, West Sumatra. They currently compete in the Liga 3 and their homeground is Gelora Haji Agus Salim Stadium.

History
PSP Padang was established in 1928, the name of PSP Padang at that time, Sport Vereniging Minang (SVM) chaired by Dr. Hakim belongs to the Padang football organization known as the Ilans Padang Electal (IPE), which became the forerunner to the establishment of PSP Padang.

However, the existence of this IPE did not last long, because the Dutch Colonial Government changed it by forming a Padang football organization in 1935 with the name Voetballbond Padang En Omstreken, at that time chaired by a Dutch "football fan" namely Meneer Vander Lee. at that time the match at night was held at the Dipo Field.

Along with domestic political turmoil, in 1942, the Netherlands handed over its power to Japan. Japan's first action was to scorch everything that smelled of the Netherlands, including VPO. This causes no Padang football achievements to stick out either as a team or individually. Nevertheless, the presence of Japan has a silver lining. At that time St. Mantari together with other Padang football figures took the initiative to change the name of the VPO to PSP (Persatuan Sepak Bola Padang), and Yusuf St. Mantari became the first general chairman under the name PSP. It turned out that at that time, Japan did not bother him at all. in that note also the name PSP was used for the first time.

Kejurnas PSSI (PSSI National Championship) era
The official national football competition began to be held based on the PSSI Congress, on 2-4 September in Semarang. Labeled the PSSI National Championship (In Indonesian: Kejuaraan Nasional), it was started in 1951. With the holding of two rounds, the competition at the district level and the national level. The Perserikatan's team that has become a member of PSSI which is ratified every annual congress.

They appeared for the first time at the 1957 PSSI National Championship, this is the national level in the 4th edition. After superior in two qualifying rounds. In the first qualification, Zone A (Sumatera zone) was inhabited by PSS (Pematangsiantar-East Sumatra) and PS Palembang (South Sumatera). PSP came out as the winner of zone A (Sumatera zone) undefeated after winning 6–0 over PSS and 5–0 over PS Palembang. In the second qualifying round, PSP joined with Persib Bandung and Persis Solo. and again, PSP Padang showed its superiority in a 3–1 win against Persib and a 4–4 draw against Persis Solo. Final standings, PSP lead the standings.

At the national level, at the end of the competition, they were ranked 5th with 4 points from the results of one win (5–1 win against Persebaya Surabaya) two draws (1–1 draw against Persija Jakarta and 1–1 draw against Persema Malang) and three defeats against PSMS Medan, Persib Bandung, and PSM Makassar. However, their performance shocked the national public at the 1957 PSSI National Championship. Strengthened by players Yus Etek, Nazar, Nono were among the outstanding players throughout the season. the goalkeeper, Yus Etek was also called up to the Indonesia national team.

Players

Current squad

Honours 
Liga Indonesia First Division
 Champion: 1996

References

External links
 

 
Football clubs in Indonesia
Football clubs in West Sumatra
Association football clubs established in 1928
1928 establishments in the Dutch East Indies